Amaia Montero Saldías (born 26 August 1976) is a Spanish singer and songwriter mainly known as the former vocalist of the Spanish pop-band La Oreja de Van Gogh between 1996 and 2007.

Amaia has sung in a variety of languages, including Basque, Spanish, Catalan, Italian, French and English. She also wrote some of the most successful singles of the band on their original versions, including "Mariposa" (2000) and "Puedes Contar Conmigo" (2003) among many others. Including her work with the band, Montero has sold over 10 million albums worldwide.

Background
Amaia Montero is the daughter of José Montero and Pilar Saldías, and has an older sister, named Idoia. She attended UPV/EHU studying Chemistry, where she met the rest of the members of La Oreja de Van Gogh. When the band became famous, she switched studies to Psychology at the UNED. She later stopped studying.

She has a vocal instructor, and even though she cannot attend classes regularly due to lack of time, the benefit to her voice is evident. Montero had nodules in her throat in 1998 when the album Dile al sol  was recorded but the nodules were removed after the first tour.

Music career

1996-2007: La Oreja de Van Gogh
"La Oreja de Van Gogh" was formed in 1996, after guitarist Pablo Benegas, bassist Álvaro Fuentes, keyboardist Xabi San Martín, and drummer Haritz Garde met at a local university. They used to record covers of songs from local bands, like Soziedad Alkoholika and international rock bands, such as U2, Janis Joplin, Tool, Pearl Jam and Nirvana, usually with San Martín providing lead vocals. Amaia Montero joined the band subsequently, following an invitation by Benegas. The two met at a dinner party after he heard Montero singing Sinéad O'Connor's "Nothing Compares 2 U".
After experimenting with band names, such as "Los Sin Nombre" they decided on La Oreja de Van Gogh which means Van Gogh's ear.

In 1998, the band was signed by Sony BMG after they won a Rock music competition in San Sebastián.
Amaia then completed work on the band's first album Dile al sol, which sold about 800,000 copies in Spain, making it the 20th best-selling album in Spanish history.

La Oreja de Van Gogh's second studio album, released on 11 September 2000, received the name of El viaje de Copperpot (Copperpot's Journey). This album was highly successful, selling more than 1,200,000 copies in Spain, becoming the 8th best-selling album of all time there, being certified Diamond. It sold 750,000 copies in Mexico going 3× Platinum  (under Mexican certification before 2001, 750,000 was 3× Platinum, but today it would be double Diamond), and more than 2,000,000 worldwide.

In 2001 they won an award for Best Spanish Act at the MTV Europe Music Awards held in Germany.

In 2003, they released their third album Lo que te conté mientras te hacías la dormida. It was their first album to sell impressively in the Americas, with over 100,000 copies sold in the States alone, and more than 2,500,000 copies worldwide. Eight singles from the album charted in Spain, four of them reaching number one. It became the 45th best-selling album of all time in Spain, while the band continued to break into the Latin American markets, including the States. It remains as the best-selling album of the 21st Century in Chile.

They won several awards in the wake of the album, including an award for Best Group or Duet at the MTV Video Music Awards Latinoamérica 2004, and an Ondas Award for Best Album. The album also received a Grammy Award nomination, for Best Latin Album. With this release the band took the live act to France, where they played at the mythical Olympia in Paris, after their sold-out show in La Cigale, and the group continued to win fans in France, Italy, Germany and Switzerland. Also tours in the U.S. where they performed in New York, Los Angeles, Miami, Boston, Chicago, Puerto Rico, Phoenix and Texas after their album "Lo Que te Conté Mientras Te Hacías La Dormida" went Platinum in that country.
More concerts in Mexico and South America followed in 2005 including a sold-out concert at Luna Park in Argentina, and two shows with crowds of over 30,000 each concert in Chile, where they received all possible audience acceptance awards when they performed at the 2005 Viña del Mar International Song Festival, taming the usually demanding crowd (traditionally called "El Monstruo", or "The Monster", because of their enthusiasm) and from there they travelled to Japan to play a sold-out show in Tokyo on 25 July 2005.

In 2006, Amaia Montero and La Oreja de Van Gogh, released their fourth and last work together called: Guapa. This album was highly successful too, becoming the 47th best-selling album of all time in Spain, being certified 7× platinum there; it went 2× platinum in Mexico, platinum in Argentina and Chile, and Gold in Colombia and the United States. Sony Music issued a special edition of this album for the Italian market as well. In 2006, the band won a Latin Grammy Award for Best Pop Album By a Duo or Group, a second nomination at the MTV Europe Music Awards for Best Spanish Act, 3 nominations at the MTV Video Music Awards Latinoamérica 2006 for Artist of the Year,  Best Group or Duet and Best Pop Artist. And in 2007 they received all audience acceptance awards at Viña del Mar International Song Festival 07. The Guapa Tour went through Latin America, USA and parts of Europe, with more than 50 shows in Spain.

In 2007, La Oreja de Van Gogh with Amaia as lead singer, became the 16th best-selling music artists of all time in Spain.

2007-present: solo career
Amaia announced her departure from the group on 19 November 2007, to launch a solo career. La Oreja de Van Gogh remains active and has now released four studio albums with new lead singer Leire Martínez.

Amaia Montero

Montero recorded her first solo album in the Italian cities of Genoa and Milan, and mixed the songs at Henson Recording Studios in Los Angeles.
This new record came after the 11 years filled with hits with La Oreja de Van Gogh.
It was released on 18 November 2008 in Spain and went to number one there, selling 40,000 copies in its first week. The album had sold one million copies overall.

The self-titled album contains eleven songs composed by Montero. She dedicates a song to her former bandmates (Tulipán) and to her father (407) who was diagnosed with cancer in 2006.
"Quiero Ser" was the first single released from the album, which peaked at number one in Spain, in its first week.
In January 2009, "Quiero Ser" became the longest charting number one single in Spanish airplay history with 13 consecutive weeks in the number one spot.

The same month, Montero started the international promotion of her debut solo album. After three weeks of promotion she had to stop the tour, and cited personal reasons. A few days later Diariovasco.com confirmed the death of Amaia's father.

Amaia Montero performed for the first time in her solo tour with Kudai & 84 in the Peruvian city Cusco. Movistar promoted her tour 2009 that continues in Peru, Ecuador, Panama, Costa Rica, Nicaragua, Mexico, Colombia, Venezuela, Uruguay, Argentina, Chile and Spain.

2
Amaia Montero's second solo album 2 was released on 8 November 2011 with the lead single being Caminando.

In 2012, she recorded a cover of "Moon River" in Catalan entitled "Riu de lluna", for the CD of TV3's telethon La Marató.

Discography

With La Oreja de Van Gogh 

 1998: Dile al sol
 2000: El viaje de Copperpot
 2003: Lo que te conté mientras te hacías la dormida
 2006: Guapa

As a solo singer 

 2008: Amaia Montero
 2011: 2
 2014: Si Dios quiere, yo también
 2018: Nacidos para creer

Other projects
Montero has appeared with other singers on projects including:

Álex Ubago - "Sin miedo a nada, Los abrazos rotos"
El Canto del Loco - "Puede ser"
José Luis Perales - "Porque te vas"
Rocío Durcal - "Me gustas mucho"
Alejandro Fernández - "Me dediqué a perderte"
Eros Ramazzotti - "Está pasando noviembre"
Presuntos Implicados - "Samurai"
Miguel Bosé - "Sevilla"
Tiziano Ferro - "El Regalo Más Grande"
Franco De Vita - "Si Tú No Estás"

References

External links

Amaia's official website
Amaia's Official Fan Club

1976 births
Basque musicians
Basque-language singers
Living people
People from Irun
Spanish rock singers
Spanish singer-songwriters
Latin Grammy Award winners
University of the Basque Country alumni
Sony Music Spain artists
Spanish women pop singers
Latin music songwriters
Rock en Español musicians
21st-century Spanish singers
21st-century Spanish women singers